Stožice is a municipality and village in Strakonice District in the South Bohemian Region of the Czech Republic. It has about 400 inhabitants.

Administrative parts
Villages of Křepice and Libějovické Svobodné Hory are administrative parts of Stožice.

Geography
It lies on the border of the České Budějovice Basin and Bohemian Forest Foothills.

History
The first written mention of Stožice is from 1416. In 1927, gold was discovered near the village of Křepice, and the village thus became the last place in the country where the gold rush occurred.

Sights
The main sights are the neo-Gothic Chapel of Saints Simon and Jude, Chapel of Saint John of Nepomuk in Křepice, and the birthplace of writer Josef Holeček.

Notable people
Josef Holeček (1853–1929), writer

References

External links

Villages in Strakonice District